Vincent Malik Edwards (born April 5, 1996) is an American professional basketball player for BCM Gravelines-Dunkerque of the LNB Pro A. He played college basketball for Purdue University.

College career
Edwards committed to Purdue from Middletown High School in Middletown, Ohio, choosing the Boilermakers over Michigan. The versatile small forward started beginning in his freshman season, earning Big Ten Conference freshman of the week honors three times. As a sophomore, Edwards averaged 11.3 points and 5.4 rebounds per game and toyed with the NBA draft before deciding to return to Purdue.

In his junior season, he averaged 12.6 points, 4.9 rebounds and 3.6 assists per game and was named third-team All-Big Ten. He scored a career-high 26 points in a 69–64 win over Indiana on February 9, 2017. While Edwards was a key player for Purdue during the season, he tended to raise his level of play in the NCAA tournament for the Boilermakers.

Following his junior season, Edwards declared for the 2017 NBA draft without hiring an agent. He ultimately decided to return to Purdue for his senior year. As a senior, Edwards averaged 14.6 points, 7.4 rebounds and 2.9 assists per game, shooting 47.6 percent from the floor and 39.8 percent from three-point range. He was a Second Team All-Big Ten selection. He finished his Purdue career with 1,638 points, 779 rebounds and 403 assists and started the second-most games for a Boilermaker with 125.

Professional career

Houston Rockets (2018–2019)
On June 21, 2018, Edwards was selected by the Utah Jazz with the 52nd pick in the 2018 NBA draft. He was subsequently traded to the Houston Rockets. On July 5, 2018, the Rockets announced that they had signed Edwards via their Twitter account. Edwards mainly competed for their G League affiliate, the Rio Grande Valley Vipers, averaging 9.7 points and 5.3 rebounds per game on a team that won the G League championship.

Oklahoma City Blue (2019–2020)
Edwards joined the Oklahoma City Blue in October 2019. On February 11, 2020, Edwards posted 35 points, 11 rebounds, two assists, two steals and two blocks in a 137–118 win over the Long Island Nets. He averaged 11.0 points and 5.3 rebounds per game in 29 games.

Canton Charge (2020)
On February 16, 2020, the Canton Charge announced that they had acquired Edwards from the Oklahoma City Blue in exchange for Tyler Cook. He averaged 3.4 points, 2.4 rebounds, and 1 assist per game for Canton.

Return to the Blue (2021)
On December 17, 2020, Edwards signed with the Sacramento Kings, but was waived two days later and signed back with the Blue on January 28, 2021.

Iowa Wolves (2021–2022)
On October 15, 2021, Edwards signed with the Minnesota Timberwolves only to be waived the next day. On October 26, he signed with the Iowa Wolves.

BCM Gravelines (2022–present)
On July 9, 2022, he has signed with BCM Gravelines-Dunkerque of the LNB Pro A.

Career stats

NBA

Regular season

|-
| style="text-align:left;"| 
| style="text-align:left;"| Houston
| 2 || 0 || 8.0 || .250 || .250 || – || 1.0 || .0 || .0 || .0 || 1.5
|- class="sortbottom"
| style="text-align:center;" colspan="2"| Career
| 2 || 0 || 8.0 || .250 || .250 || – || 1.0 || .0 || .0 || .0 || 1.5

International career
Edwards was a part of the Purdue team chosen to represent the United States in the 2017 Summer Universiade in Taipei, ROC. and they captured a silver medal.

Edwards signed with the Titanes del Distrito Nacional in the Dominican National Basketball League (LNB) for the 2022 season.

Personal life
Edwards is the son of former Wright State star and NBA player Bill Edwards.

References

External links
Purdue Boilermakers bio
College statistics @ sports-reference.com

1996 births
Living people
21st-century African-American sportspeople
African-American basketball players
American men's basketball players
Basketball players from Ohio
BCM Gravelines players
Canton Charge players
Houston Rockets players
Iowa Wolves players
Medalists at the 2017 Summer Universiade
Oklahoma City Blue players
Purdue Boilermakers men's basketball players
Rio Grande Valley Vipers players
Small forwards
Sportspeople from Middletown, Ohio
Universiade medalists in basketball
Universiade silver medalists for the United States
Utah Jazz draft picks